Tatyana Nikolayevna Dronina (born 16 November 1978) is a Russian team handball player, playing for the club  Zvezda Zvenigorod and for the Russian women's national handball team.

At the 2009 World Women's Handball Championship she reached the final and won the gold medal with the Russian team.

References

External links
 

 

Year of birth missing (living people)
Living people
Russian female handball players
Place of birth missing (living people)